The 2008 Speedway World Cup Race-off was the third race of the 2008 Speedway World Cup season. It took place on July 17, 2008 in the Speedway Center in Vojens, Denmark.

Results

Heat details

Heat after heat 
 Gollob, Davidsson, Gizatullin, Richardson
 Jonsson, Jaguś, Woffinden
 Holta, Harris, Ljung, Iwanow
 Lindgren, Kennett, Walasek, Gafurov (X)
 Nicholls, Hampel, Laguta, Nermark
 Walasek, Richardson, Iwanow, Nermark
 Woffinden, Davidsson, Hampel, Gafurov
 Harris, Jonsson, Gollob, Laguta
 Ljung, Jaguś, Gizatullin, Kennett (Fx)
 Holta, Lindgren, Nicholls, Iwanow
 Jonsson, Holta, Richardson, Gafurov
 Walasek, Laguta, Woffinden, Ljung
 Lindgren, Harris, Hampel, Gizatullin
 Nermark, Gollob, Kennett, Gafurov (e4)
 Davidsson, Jaguś, Nicholls (2 - joker), Iwanow
 Ljung, Harris, Hampel, Gizatullin
 Lindgren, Gollob, Woffinden, Iwanow
 Jaguś, Harris, Gafurov, Nermark
 Laguta, Davidsson, Holta, Kennett
 Jonsson, Nicholls, Walasek, Gizatullin
 Lindgren, Jaguś, Richardson, Laguta (X)
 Nermark, Woffinden, Gizatullin, Holta (e3)
 Laguta (6 - joker), Walasek (4 - joker), Davidsson, Harris
 Hampel, Jonsson, Woffinden, Iwanow
 Ljung, Gollob, Nicholls, Gafurov (e4)

References

See also 
 2008 Speedway World Cup
 motorcycle speedway

R